Şıxlar (known as Çəyirli until 2015) is a village in the municipality of Çərəcə in the Goychay Rayon of Azerbaijan.

References

Populated places in Goychay District